La Jara is a statutory town in Conejos County, Colorado, United States.  The population was 818 at the 2010 United States Census.

Geography
La Jara is in the San Luis Valley region of Colorado. U.S. Route 285 passes through La Jara, leading north  to Alamosa and south  to the New Mexico border and beyond.

Demographics

As of the census of 2000, there were 877 people, 313 households, and 230 families residing in the town. The racial makeup of the town was 67.27% White, 0.11% African American, 2.85% Native American, 27.02% from other races, and 2.74% from two or more races. Hispanic or Latino of any race were 62.94% of the population.

There were 313 households, out of which 38.0% had children under the age of 18 living with them, 54.0% were married couples living together, 13.7% had a female householder with no husband present, and 26.5% were non-families. 22.7% of all households were made up of individuals, and 9.6% had someone living alone who was 65 years of age or older.  The average household size was 2.79 and the average family size was 3.30.

In the town, the population was spread out, with 31.6% under the age of 18, 8.6% from 18 to 24, 24.5% from 25 to 44, 23.3% from 45 to 64, and 12.1% who were 65 years of age or older.  The median age was 35 years. For every 100 females, there were 91.9 males.  For every 100 females age 18 and over, there were 87.5 males.

The median income for a household in the town was $24,167, and the median income for a family was $29,643. Males had a median income of $25,208 versus $20,368 for females. The per capita income for the town was $11,877.  Below the poverty line were 25.5% of people, 22.8% of families, 28.4% of those under 18 and 26.5% of those over 64.

Notable people
Eppie Archuleta, master weaver and 1985 recipient of the National Heritage Fellowship
Morton Blackwell, conservative political activist, born in La Jara in 1939
Donald Valdez, Colorado State Representative

See also

References

External links
CDOT map of the Town of La Jara
SLV Dweller - San Luis Valley news, culture, history and events

Towns in Conejos County, Colorado
Towns in Colorado